Çayqovuşan (also, Chaykovushan) is a village in the Ismailli Rayon of Azerbaijan.  The village forms part of the municipality of İstisu.

References 

Populated places in Ismayilli District